The Orhangazi Tunnel, is a motorway tunnel located at Samanlı Mountains in Marmara Region as part of the Istanbul-Bursa Motorway  in Turkey.

Situated northeast of Orhangazi town between Laladere and Yeniköy villages on the province border of Yalova and Bursa, it is a twin-tube tunnel of length  carrying three lanes of traffic in each direction. The construction works began on 15 February 2012, and are being carried out by Otoyol A.Ş., a consortium of Turkish Nurol, Özaltın, Makyol, Yüksel, Göçay and Italian Astaldi companies. The New Austrian Tunnelling method (NATM) was applied for the boring of the tunnel.

Breakthrough in one of the tubes was achieved on 19 February 2014 after two years and four days of work. A related ceremony was held at site in presence of Deputy Prime Minister Bülent Arınç and Minister of Transport, Maritime and Communication Lütfi Elvan on 3 March 2014. It is the longest motorway tunnel of Turkey. The tunnel's opening to traffic was in April 2016.

Other tunnels on the route are the -long Selçukgazi Tunnel and the -long Belkahve Tunnel.

See also
List of motorway tunnels in Turkey

References

External links
 Images from the construction site by Otoyol A.Ş.

Road tunnels in Turkey
Transport in Bursa Province
Transport in Yalova Province
Transport infrastructure completed in 2016